War Dogs is a 1942 American film directed by S. Roy Luby.

Premise 

A police dog is trained as a war dog by the army, after its donation by a young boy.

Cast 
Billy Lee as Billy Freeman
Addison Richards as Capt. William 'Wild Bill' Freeman
Bradley Page as Judge Roger Davis
Kay Linaker as Joan Allen
Herbert Rawlinson as David J. Titus
Lee Phelps as Sgt. Day
John Berkes as Stoner – Grocer
Bryant Washburn as Col. Mason
George N. Neise as Hans – Saboteur
Donald Curtis as Fred – Saboteur
Hal Price as Officer Sullivan
Steve Clark as Wilson – Senior dog trainer
Ace the Wonder Dog as Pal – Billy's Dog

External links 

1942 films
American black-and-white films
American war drama films
War romance films
American adventure drama films
Monogram Pictures films
Films about war dogs
World War II films made in wartime
1942 drama films
Films directed by S. Roy Luby
1940s English-language films